P. vulgare may refer to:
 Polypodium vulgare, the common polypody, a fern species
 Polystigma vulgare, a synonym for Bionectria ochroleuca

See also
 Vulgare